Hassengers Corner is an unincorporated community at the intersection of Maryland Route 213 and Maryland Route 561 in Kent County, Maryland, United States.

References

Unincorporated communities in Kent County, Maryland
Unincorporated communities in Maryland